Lorenzo Martínez Cordero (born September 5, 1951) is a Cuban former volleyball player who competed in the 1972 Summer Olympics and in the 1976 Summer Olympics.

In 1972 he was part of the Cuban team which finished tenth in the Olympic tournament. He played five matches.

Four years later he won the bronze medal with the Cuban team in the 1976 Olympic tournament. He played all six matches.

External links
 profile

1951 births
Living people
Cuban men's volleyball players
Olympic volleyball players of Cuba
Volleyball players at the 1972 Summer Olympics
Volleyball players at the 1976 Summer Olympics
Olympic bronze medalists for Cuba
Olympic medalists in volleyball
Medalists at the 1976 Summer Olympics
Pan American Games medalists in volleyball
Pan American Games gold medalists for Cuba
Medalists at the 1971 Pan American Games